Demetrios I may refer to:

 Demetrios I Kantakouzenos, Despot of the Morea in 1383
 Demetrios I of Constantinople (1914–1991), Ecumenical Patriarch of Constantinople in 1972–1991

See also
 Patriarch Dimitrije, Serbian Patriarch in 1920–1930
 Demetrius I (disambiguation), various